Okatyali Constituency (also: Okatjali) is an electoral constituency in the Oshana Region of Namibia. It had 2,815 inhabitants in 2004 and 2,051 registered voters . Its district capital is the settlement of Okatyali.

Politics and governance

Okatyali constituency is traditionally a stronghold of the South West Africa People's Organization (SWAPO) party. The first regional councillor for this constituency was Paulus Kapia. He served until 1998. 

In the 2015 local and regional elections the SWAPO candidate won uncontested and became councillor after no opposition party nominated a candidate. The SWAPO candidate won the 2020 regional election by a landslide. Josef Mupetami obtained 992 votes, followed by Aveli Nambili of the Independent Patriots for Change (IPC), an opposition party formed in August 2020, with 80 votes, and Silvanus Nakale of the Popular Democratic Movement with 33 votes.

References

Constituencies of Oshana Region
States and territories established in 1992
1992 establishments in Namibia